Miller Township is located in LaSalle County, Illinois, United States. As of the 2010 census, its population was 633 and it contained 235 housing units. Miller Township was formed from Manlius Township and Mission Township on an unknown date.

Geography

Demographics

References

External links
US Census
City-data.com
Illinois State Archives

Townships in LaSalle County, Illinois
Townships in Illinois